Simon Booth may refer to:

Simon Booth (rugby league, born 1956), played for Manly and Balmain
Simon Booth (rugby league, born 1971), played in England in the 1990s
Simon Booth (runner) (born 1968), British fell runner
Simon Booth, pseudonym for musician Simon Emmerson